András Vonza (born 28 July 1955) is a Hungarian vet and politician, who served as Minister of Agriculture and Rural Development between 2001 and 2002.

References
 Bölöny, József – Hubai, László: Magyarország kormányai 1848–2004 [Cabinets of Hungary 1848–2004], Akadémiai Kiadó, Budapest, 2004 (5th edition).
 Zsigmond Király Főiskola - Jelenkutató Csoport

1955 births
Living people
People from Szabolcs-Szatmár-Bereg County
Independent Smallholders, Agrarian Workers and Civic Party politicians
Agriculture ministers of Hungary